Luciano Darío Vietto (born 5 December 1993) is an Argentine professional footballer who plays for Saudi Pro League side Al Hilal.

Club career

Early career
Vietto was born in the small town of Balnearia in the Province of Córdoba. He joined his local team Independiente de Balnearia at the age of seven.

At the age of 15, Vietto joined Argentine Primera División club Estudiantes, but was released two years later. He subsequently moved to Racing Club's youth academy, after a failed trial at Rosario Central.

Racing Club
In 2011 Vietto signed his first professional contract, and was called up to the main squad by manager Diego Simeone on 25 October. He made his professional debut on a day later, coming on as a late substitute in a 1–1 home draw against Lanús.

Vietto was handed his first start on 3 September 2012, scoring his first professional goals (and his first hat-trick) in a 3–1 home success over San Martín de San Juan. He became a regular starter under Luis Zubeldía and contributed with 13 goals during the campaign, as his side only finished fifth.

Vietto signed a four-year contract extension with Racing on 26 March 2013.

Vietto appeared in 35 matches in 2013–14, scoring five times. Highlights included a brace in a 3–1 away win against Gimansia La Plata on 2 November 2013.

Villarreal

On 4 August 2014, Vietto signed a five-year deal with La Liga side Villarreal CF, for a rumoured €5.5 million fee. He made his debut for the club on the 21st, coming on as a second-half substitute for Ikechukwu Uche in a 3–0 Europa League play-off victory over Astana, before scoring twice in the return leg at home.

Vietto made his La Liga debut on 24 August, replacing Giovani dos Santos for the last 10 minutes of a 2–0 away win against Valencian rivals Levante UD. On 21 September he scored his first goals in the competition, netting a brace in a 4–2 home win over Rayo Vallecano.

Vietto added another double on 21 December, in a 3–0 win against the Deportivo de La Coruña also at the Estadio El Madrigal. He finished the month with three goals, with his side moving to  sixth position, and earning him the honour of La Liga Player of the Month.

Atlético Madrid
On 22 June 2015, Villarreal confirmed Vietto had joined Atlético Madrid for a fee reported to be in the region of €20 million. Vietto scored his first goal for Atlético on 4 October 2015 as he tapped in a cross from Jackson Martínez to equalize against archrivals Real Madrid in a league match that eventually ended 1–1.

Sevilla (loan)
On 30 July 2016, Atlético Madrid and Sevilla reached an agreement for the loan of Vietto with an option to buy.

Valencia (loan)
On 4 January 2018, Vietto signed a loan deal with Valencia for the remainder of the season with an option to buy in the summer. Vietto made his debut against Girona coming on as a sub. In a Copa Del Rey fixture against Las Palmas, Vietto scored his first ever hat-trick in Spain.

Fulham (loan)
On 9 August 2018, Vietto joined English Premier League club Fulham on a season-long loan. He scored first goal and only for the club against Brighton in 4–2 win at Craven Cottage.

Sporting CP
On 14 May 2019, Portuguese club Sporting CP announced they have reached a deal with Atlético Madrid for Vietto worth approximately €7.5 million, effective on 1 July 2019.
On 23 September 2019, Vietto scored his first goal for Sporting, the opener of an eventual 1-2 defeat against Famalicão.

Al-Hilal
On 25 October 2020, Saudi club Al Hilal SFC announced they have reached a deal with Sporting CP for Vietto worth approximately €7 million.

Al-Shabab (loan)
On 29 January 2022, Vietto joined city rivals Al-Shabab on a six-month loan.

International career

Youth teams
On 9 January 2013, Vietto made his international debut for the Argentina national under-20 team against Chile at the year's South American Youth Championship. He scored his first goal four days later, but in a 1–2 loss against Paraguay, and finished the tournament with two goals in four games.

Personal life
Vietto is the brother of the footballer Federico Vietto.

Career statistics

Honours
Atlético Madrid
UEFA Champions League runner-up: 2015–16

Sporting CP
Primeira Liga: 2020–21

Al Hilal
Saudi Professional League: 2020–21
King Cup: 2019–20
Saudi Super Cup: 2021
FIFA Club World Cup  runner-up: 2022

Individual
La Liga Player of the Month: December 2014
 UEFA Europa League Top assists: 2014–15
 FIFA Club World Cup Bronze Ball: 2022

Notes

References

External links
 
 
 
 Luciano Vietto at Topforward

1993 births
Living people
Sportspeople from Córdoba Province, Argentina
Argentine footballers
Association football forwards
Argentine Primera División players
Racing Club de Avellaneda footballers
La Liga players
Villarreal CF players
Atlético Madrid footballers
Sevilla FC players
Valencia CF players
Premier League players
Fulham F.C. players
Primeira Liga players
Sporting CP footballers
Saudi Professional League players
Al Hilal SFC players
Al-Shabab FC (Riyadh) players
Argentina youth international footballers
Argentine expatriate footballers
Argentine people of Italian descent
Expatriate footballers in Spain
Expatriate footballers in England
Expatriate footballers in Portugal
Expatriate footballers in Saudi Arabia
Argentine expatriate sportspeople in Spain
Argentine expatriate sportspeople in England
Argentine expatriate sportspeople in Portugal
Argentine expatriate sportspeople in Saudi Arabia